The 2019 East Riding of Yorkshire Council election took place on 2 May 2019 to elect all 67 members of East Riding of Yorkshire Council in England. This was on the same day as other local elections. The whole of the council was up for election and the Conservative Party retained control of the council.

Summary

Election result

|-

Ward results

Beverley Rural

Bridlington Central and Old Town

Bridlington North

Bridlington South

Cottingham North

Cottingham South

Dale

Driffield and Rural

East Wolds and Coastal

Goole North

Goole South

Hessle

Howden

Howdenshire

Mid Holderness

Minster and Woodmansey

North Holderness

Pocklington Provincial

Snaith, Airmyn and Rawcliffe and Marshland

South East Holderness

South Hunsley

South West Holderness

St. Mary's

Tranby

Willerby and Kirk Ella

Wolds Weighton

By-elections

Changes during the term

References

2019 English local elections
East Riding of Yorkshire Council elections
2010s in the East Riding of Yorkshire
May 2019 events in the United Kingdom